Hiro Murai (born 1983) is a Japanese-American filmmaker based in Los Angeles. His most notable works include internationally successful music videos for artists such as Childish Gambino, Earl Sweatshirt, Chet Faker, Flying Lotus, David Guetta, St. Vincent, The Shins, The Fray, Bloc Party, Queens of the Stone Age, and FKA Twigs.

He received a Grammy Award in 2019 for Best Music Video for "This is America" with Childish Gambino. He also received five Primetime Emmy Award nominations for the FX series Atlanta (2016–2022), and the HBO limited series Station Eleven (2021–2022). He is a frequent director of Bill Hader's HBO series Barry (2018–present) and executive produces the Hulu series The Bear (2022–present).

Early life and education
Murai was born to Japanese popular music composer Kunihiko Murai. He moved to Los Angeles when he was nine years old. He graduated with a degree from the USC School of Cinematic Arts.

After graduation, Murai turned to freelance work as the director of photography for numerous music videos, as well as VFX and storyboarding, most notably for Ace Norton. After some time Murai began to direct low budget films.

Career 
In 2013, he directed the short film Clapping for the Wrong Reasons, a companion piece for Childish Gambino's second studio album, Because the Internet, and its attached screenplay. In the same year, he created a multi-panel video set for Frank Ocean's performance at the Grammys.

Since 2016, Murai has directed several episodes of the comedy-drama Atlanta, collaborating again with Donald Glover (aka Childish Gambino). For his work on the show, he has received three nominations for the Emmy Award for Outstanding Comedy Series and Outstanding Directing for a Comedy Series.

In 2016 he directed a Nike campaign starring Chance The Rapper.

He directed the music video for Childish Gambino's "This Is America", released on May 5, 2018, which was described as "the most talked-about music video of recent memory", and which Billboard critics ranked 10th among the "greatest music videos of the 21st century." In 2019, Murai won the Grammy Award for Best Music Video for directing the video. 

In November 2018, the trailer for his debut feature film Guava Island, starring Donald Glover and Rihanna, premiered at the Pharos Festival in New Zealand. Guava Island was released on April 13, 2019, by Amazon Studios through Amazon Prime Video. On Rotten Tomatoes, the film has an approval rating of 74% based on reviews from 43 critics, with an average rating of 6.60/10. On Metacritic, it has a weighted average score of 64 out of 100, based on 8 reviews, indicating "generally favorable" reviews.

In 2021, Murai directed the first and third episode the science fiction miniseries Station Eleven for HBO Max.

In June 2018, it was announced that he would direct a science fiction feature film, Man Alive, written by David Robert Mitchell.

Filmography

Film

Television

Music videos

Awards and nominations
(2009) MVPA Award for Best Video under $25K. The Fray "Heartless"
(2012) Best Music Video Lists:  Pitchfork / BuzzFeed / Consequence of Sound / Video Static / Co.Create / NPR Music - for St. Vincent "Cheerleader" and Earl Sweatshirt "Chum"
(2013) MVPA Best Electronic Video: David Guetta - "She Wolf"
(2014) UKMVA Director of the Year / Best Rock / Indie Video International QOTSA for Smooth Sailing.
(2014) Best Music Videos Lists: The Verge, Pitchfork, IMVDB, Stereogum

References

External links
Official website

Hiro Murai at the Internet Music Video Database

1983 births
Living people
American film directors of Japanese descent
Grammy Award winners
Filmmakers from California
Japanese filmmakers
People from Tokyo
USC School of Cinematic Arts alumni
Japanese emigrants to the United States